Paraguay competed at the 1992 Summer Olympics in Barcelona, Spain. 27 competitors, 24 men and 3 women, took part in 12 events in 6 sports.

Competitors
The following is the list of number of competitors in the Games.

Athletics

Key
Note–Ranks given for track events are within the athlete's heat only
Q = Qualified for the next round
q = Qualified for the next round as a fastest loser or, in field events, by position without achieving the qualifying target
NR = National record
N/A = Round not applicable for the event
Bye = Athlete not required to compete in round

Men
Field

Women
Field

Fencing

Two male fencers represented Paraguay in 1992.

Ranks given are within the group.

Football

Men's team competition
 Preliminary round

Group C

Quarterfinals

 Team roster
 ( 1) Ruben Ruiz Diaz
 ( 2) Andres Duarte
 ( 3) Osvaldo Peralta
 ( 4) Juan Ramon Jara
 ( 5) Celso Ayala
 ( 6) Carlos Gamarra
 ( 7) Francisco Ferreira
 ( 8) Hugo Sosa
 ( 9) Arsenio Benitez
 (10) Gustavo Neffa
 (11) Julio César Yegros
 (12) César Velázquez
 (13) Juan Marecos
 (14) Ricardo Sanabria
 (15) Guido Alvarenga
 (16) Francisco Arce
 (17) Héctor Sosa
 (18) Charles Bourdier
 (19) Mauro Caballero
 (20) Jorge Luis Campos
Head coach: Sergio Markarian

Judo

Swimming

Tennis

See also
Paraguay at the 1991 Pan American Games

References

External links
Official Olympic Reports

Nations at the 1992 Summer Olympics
1992
Olympics